The former government of Alexei Kosygin was dissolved following the Soviet legislative election of 1979. Kosygin was once again elected Premier by the Politburo and the Central Committee following the election. His fourth government lasted a little over one year due to bad health which led him to resign.

Ministries

Committees

References
General

Government of the Soviet Union > List
 

Specific

Soviet governments
1979 establishments in the Soviet Union
1980 disestablishments
Era of Stagnation